The Best of Earth, Wind & Fire, Vol. 2 is the second greatest hits album by American band Earth, Wind & Fire, which was released in November 1988 upon Columbia Records. The Best of Earth, Wind & Fire, Vol. 2 has been certified Gold in the US by the RIAA.

Overview
The album is the follow-up to the Quintuple Platinum album The Best of Earth, Wind & Fire, Vol. 1, containing singles from the band's later career throughout the late 1970s and the 1980s. It also features the song "Serpentine Fire", which was not included on Vol 1.

Alongside the singles, the album contained a previously unreleased song entitled "Turn on (The Beat Box)", which was released as a single and reached number 26 on the Billboard Hot R&B Singles chart.

Critical reception

Ron Wynn of Allmusic gave a 4.5 out of five stars rating and wrote, "If you enjoyed their disco and late '70s cuts more than the early tracks, this anthology is worth getting". Ben Varkentine of Popmatters found that "Earth, Wind & Fire Vol. II can't be reviewed so much as announced. If you want this CD, you know what at least some of it sounds like, if not, you don't." David Browne of the New York Daily News exclaimed, "Not as solid as Vol. I, but separates the wheat from the chaff of their later albums. 'After the Love Is Gone' and 'Boogie Wonderland' are here, but last year's comeback, 'System of Survival', isn't. With an A− grade, Robert Christgau of the Village Voice described the album as "some slick, soulful fun".

Track listing

Charts and Certifications

Charts

Albums

Singles

Certifications

References 

Albums produced by Maurice White
Albums produced by Charles Stepney
Albums produced by Joe Wissert
1988 greatest hits albums
Earth, Wind & Fire compilation albums
1988 albums
Columbia Records compilation albums